Desmond Norman Orr Boal (8 August 1928 – 23 April 2015) was a unionist politician and barrister from Northern Ireland.

Boal had a legal career before he entered politics in 1960. He was the Ulster Unionist Party (UUP) Member of the Parliament of Northern Ireland for the Shankill constituency between 1960 and 1972. He was very critical of the leadership under Captain Terence O'Neill, then Prime Minister of Northern Ireland. Boal opposed the manner, if not the substance, of O'Neill's attempts at improving relations with both the Irish government and the Roman Catholic/Irish nationalist minority in Northern Ireland, along with many backbenchers.

Discontented with James Chichester-Clark and Brian Faulkner who came to government after O'Neill's 1969 fall from power, Boal resigned from the UUP in 1971 and joined Ian Paisley in establishing the Democratic Unionist Party (DUP) in order to provide dissident unionist opinion with a viable political alternative. He worked as the first chairman and one of the first public representatives of the DUP and continued to sit in Stormont during the years of 1971–1972. He later resumed his practice as a barrister.

Boal died in April 2015, aged 86.

References

1928 births
2015 deaths
Democratic Unionist Party members of the House of Commons of Northern Ireland
Members of the House of Commons of Northern Ireland 1958–1962
Members of the House of Commons of Northern Ireland 1962–1965
Members of the House of Commons of Northern Ireland 1965–1969
Members of the House of Commons of Northern Ireland 1969–1973
People from County Londonderry
Politicians from Northern Ireland
Ulster Protestant Action members
Ulster Unionist Party members of the House of Commons of Northern Ireland
Northern Ireland King's Counsel
Members of the House of Commons of Northern Ireland for Belfast constituencies